Aethes intactana is a species of moth of the family Tortricidae. It was described by Walsingham in 1879. It is found in the United States, where it has been recorded from California.

References

intactana
Moths described in 1879
Moths of North America